Heterosmilax was considered a genus of flowering plants in the family Smilacaceae. It was native to southern China and Southeast Asia. Subsequent molecular phylogenetic studies showed that it was embedded within another genus, Smilax and was reduced to a section within that genus.  

 Species
 Heterosmilax borneensis A.DC.  - Cambodia, Thailand, Vietnam, Malaysia, Borneo, Sumatra 
 Heterosmilax chinensis F.T.Wang - Guangdong, Guangxi, Sichuan, Yunnan
 Heterosmilax gaudichaudiana (Kunth) Maxim - Vietnam, Fujian, Guangdong, Guangxi, Hainan, Taiwan 
 Heterosmilax longiflora K.Y.Guan & Noltie - Yunnan
 Heterosmilax micrandra T.Koyama - Hainan
 Heterosmilax micrantha (Blume) Bakh.f. - Java
 Heterosmilax paniculata Gagnep. - Cambodia, Vietnam
 Heterosmilax pertenuis (T.Koyama) T.Koyama - Thailand
 Heterosmilax polyandra Gagnep. - Yunnan, Assam, Laos, Thailand
 Heterosmilax seisuiensis (Hayata) F.T.Wang & Tang - Taiwan
 Heterosmilax septemnervia F.T.Wang & Tang - Vietnam, Guangdong, Guangxi, Guizhou, Hubei, Hunan, Sichuan, Yunnan 
 Heterosmilax yunnanensis Gagnep. - Yunnan

References

Smilacaceae
Liliales genera